Dampskibsselskabet Norden A/S (commonly abbreviated D/S Norden or NORDEN) is a Danish shipping company operating in the dry cargo and tanker segment worldwide.

The company headquarters are located in Copenhagen, Denmark and the company is listed on the Copenhagen Stock Exchange.

History 
 
NORDEN is one of Denmark's oldest shipping companies, founded in 1871 by Mads Christian Holm.  It was named after its first vessel, a Glasgow-built steamship. The company is composed of a dry cargo and a tanker division.

Operations

Dry cargo
In dry cargo, NORDEN is one of the world’s largest operators of Supramax and Panamax dry cargo vessels and has activities in the Handysize and Post-Panamax vessel types as well.

Tanker
In tankers, NORDEN is active in the Handysize, MR and LR1 product tanker vessel types

The product tanker activities are operated through the Norient Product Pool, which is jointly owned by NORDEN and Interorient Navigation Company Ltd.

Takeover bid by TORM 
In 2002 rival shipping company DS TORM tried to take over NORDEN. Despite resistance from some shareholders, TORM eventually gained control of almost 33% of NORDEN's shares. Although the takeover attempt was unsuccessful, rising stock prices meant that TORM held onto the shares until 2007.

Fleet 
NORDEN's fleet is among the most modern and competitive in the industry and the firm operates in total about 300 dry cargo- and tanker vessels (a mix of owned and chartered tonnage).

NORDEN has its head office in Hellerup (north of Copenhagen), Denmark and offices in Singapore, Shanghai, Annapolis, Rio de Janeiro, Mumbai, Santiago, Melbourne and Vancouver. At its offices the company has in total about 310 employees and about 640 are employed on the Company’s owned vessels.

NORDEN was a founding member of the Danish Shipowners' Association in 1884 and has been a member ever since. It is also a member of the international organisations; Intertanko (The International Association of Independent Tanker Owners), BIMCO (The Baltic and International Maritime Council) and ICC Denmark (International Chamber of Commerce).

References

External links 
 
 Source

Shipping companies of Denmark
Shipping companies based in Copenhagen
Companies based in Gentofte Municipality
Tanker shipping companies
Danish companies established in 1871